The 1981 Clemson Tigers football team represented Clemson University in the Atlantic Coast Conference.  The Tigers were led by head coach Danny Ford and played their home games in Memorial Stadium.  Clemson finished their undefeated 1981 season with a 22–15 victory over the #4 Nebraska Cornhuskers in the 1982 Orange Bowl, and were voted #1 in the Associated Press (AP) and United Press International (UPI) polls, despite an NCAA investigation into recruiting violations of two players and threatening to refuse to play a game if the story was aired for fear of influencing poll voters. Clemson would be put on a two-year probation in 1982 over infractions from 1977-1982.

Achievements 
The Clemson Tigers finished the 1981 season undefeated and untied (12–0) and were voted No. 1 in the Associated Press and UPI polls.  Following the bowl win over Nebraska, a consensus national champsionship was secured via voting by AP, UPI, Football Writers Association of America (FWAA), and National Football Foundation (NFF).  The Clemson Tigers of the 1980s were the fifth winningest Division I college football team of the decade, with a record of 86-25-4 (.765).

Clemson head coach Danny Ford was awarded the 1981 Coach of the Year Award by the American Football Coaches Association (AFCA) and the FWAA.  At the time, Coach Ford was the youngest ever to receive the award, and the youngest to have won a National Championship.

In the 1982 Orange Bowl, Clemson QB Homer Jordan received Offensive Most Valuable Player honors.  He earned first-team All-ACC honors in 1981, his junior season, and finished first in the ACC in passing efficiency and 12th in the nation. Jordan was an honorable mention All-American selection in 1981. He was runner-up for ACC MVP behind teammate Jeff Davis, but the team voted him MVP in 1981.  Even though Jordan was injured for much of his senior season, he helped lead the 1982 team to a 9-1-1 record and number-eight national ranking. He also earned honorable mention All-American honors as a senior. He ranked as Clemson's 18th greatest player of the century. Jordan was inducted into the Clemson Hall of Fame in 1993.

Clemson LB Jeff Davis, captain of Clemson's 1981 team, was inducted into the Clemson Ring of Honor in 1995. Davis was a Consensus All-American in 1981 when he led the Tigers in tackles. Davis was also named MVP of the ACC and was the defensive MVP of the Orange Bowl victory over Nebraska.  Davis has the third best mark in career tackles in Clemson history and has also caused the most fumbles and recovered the most fumbles in team history. He was a fifth-round draft pick of the Tampa Bay Buccaneers and played for them from 1982-87. He led the Buccaneers in tackles and was the captain of the team for four seasons.  Along with being in the Clemson Ring of Honor, Davis was inducted into the Clemson Hall of Fame in 1989 and the South Carolina Hall of Fame in 2001. He was named to Clemson's Centennial football team in 1996 and was inducted into the College Football Hall of Fame in December 2007.

Clemson DB Terry Kinard is the only Clemson player to be a unanimous All-America pick. He was the first two-time Clemson All-American defensive back and a first-team AP All-American two years in a row, the only Clemson player to accomplish that. Kinard was named the CBS National Defensive Player-of-the-Year for the 1982 season and was chosen to the USA Today All-College Football Team in the 1980s.  Kinard was a two-year member of the All-ACC team.  He is the all-time Clemson leader in interceptions with 17, a mark that tied the 20-year-old ACC record. He also holds the Clemson record for tackles by a defensive back with 294 in his career.  After leaving Clemson Kinard was a first-round pick of the New York Giants in 1983, and was the 10th pick overall in the draft. Sports Illustrated named him to College Football's Centennial Team in 1999. He played with Super Bowl Champion New York Giants in 1986 and was with the club from 1983 until 1989. Kinard played in the 1988 Pro Bowl Game. Kinard played with Houston Oilers in 1990.  He was named to Clemson's Centennial team in April 1996. He ranks as Clemson's #3 football player of all-time was inducted into the College Football Hall of Fame in December 2001. He was inducted into Clemson Hall of Fame in 1992 and the Ring of Honor in 2001. He was also inducted into the state of South Carolina Hall of Fame in 2002.

Clemson WR Perry Tuttle was voted a first-team All-American in 1981, and set then-Clemson records for receptions and yards.  Tuttle also had at least one reception during the last 32 games of his Tiger career. He still ranks fourth all-time in receptions (150), second all-time in receiving yards (2,534), second in touchdown receptions (17), and ninth in yards per reception (16.89).  In the 1982 Orange Bowl, he had five receptions for 56 yards, including a 13-yard touchdown pass. That touchdown catch was the final reception of his Clemson career and earned him a place on the cover of Sports Illustrated.  Following his Clemson career, Tuttle was chosen with the 19th overall pick of the 1982 NFL Draft by the Buffalo Bills. After a three-year NFL career, Tuttle went on to the Canadian Football League where he had a six-year career with the Winnipeg Blue Bombers.  He helped lead the team to a Grey Cup Championship in 1990 and was inducted into the Winnipeg Hall of Fame in 1997. Tuttle was inducted into the Clemson Hall of Fame in 1991 and named to Clemson's Centennial team in 1996.

Notable 
Clemson hosted the Wofford Terriers on Saturday, September 5, 1981, in both teams' season opener.  Wofford was one of the three teams Clemson played in its first year of football competition in 1896, but had not played the Terriers since 1940.  Clemson had originally scheduled Villanova University for the third game of the 1981 season (scheduled for Saturday, September 26, 1981) but the Wildcats had canceled their football program in the spring of that year (the Wildcats restarted football in 1985, and became a full NCAA Division I-AA member in 1987).  Wofford had an open spot in their schedule and agreed to play Clemson.

Schedule

Roster

Depth chart

Game summaries

Wofford

at Tulane

Georgia

at Kentucky

Virginia

at Duke

NC State

Wake Forest

at North Carolina

Maryland

at South Carolina

vs. Nebraska (Orange Bowl)

Coaching staff
Danny Ford - Head Coach
Tom Harper - Assistant Head Coach/Defensive Coordinator/Defensive Line
Nelson Stokley - Offensive Coordinator/Quarterbacks
Willie Anderson - Defensive Line
Steve Hale - Defensive Ends
Les Herrin - Linebackers
Curley Hallman/Rick Whitt - Defensive Backs
Larry Van Der Heyden/Buddy King - Offensive Line
Rex Kipps - Tight Ends
Chuck Reedy - Running Backs
Lawson Holland - Wide Receivers
George Dostal-Strength and Conditioning
Fred Hoover - Head Athletic Trainer
Bert Henderson - Assistant Trainer
Bob Easley -  Student Trainer
Joe Franks - Student Trainer
Greg Craig - Student Trainer
Vann Yates - Student Trainer
Jay Bennett - Student Trainer
Chip Winchester - Student Trainer
Len Gough - Equipment Manager
George Caine - Graduate Assistant
Mark Garrison - Student Manager

References

Clemson
Clemson Tigers football seasons
College football national champions
Atlantic Coast Conference football champion seasons
Orange Bowl champion seasons
College football undefeated seasons
Clemson Tigers football